Praveen Kumar Sobti (6 December 1947 – 7 February 2022) was an Indian hammer and discus thrower, film actor, politician, and soldier with Border Security Force. As a 20 year old he joined then newly raised Border Security Force from where he attracted the attention of his officers through his fine athletic skills and went to represent India at various athletic events in "Discus throw".  As an athlete he won four medals at the Asian Games, including two gold medals, won a silver medal in the Commonwealth Games and competed in two Olympics. As an actor, he starred in more than 50 Hindi films and played the famous character of "Bheem" in B.R. Chopra's television series Mahabharat that started in 1988. As a politician he contested the 2013 Delhi Legislative elections on an Aam Aadmi Party ticket, but lost. Subsequently, in 2014, he joined the Bharatiya Janata Party.

Sports

Kumar was a star of Indian athletics in the 1960s and the 1970s. He dominated the Indian hammer and discus throws for several years. He won gold medals in the discus throw at the 1966 and 1970 Asian Games, holding the Asian Games record of 56.76 metres. He was a silver medalist in the 1966 Commonwealth Games in Kingston and in the 1974 Asian Games in Tehran. He competed in the 1968 Summer Olympics and in the 1972 Summer Olympics.

Cinematic Journey
Praveen Kumar's debut film was Raksha, a James Bond style Indian movie starring Jeetendra with him playing a large henchman Gorilla inspired by Jaws of The Spy Who Loved Me. He did similar role of large henchman Justin fighting against Jeetendra in Meri Awaz Suno.

Praveen Kumar earned national acclaim when he played the role "Bheem" in B R Chopra's popular mythological tele serial Mahabharata, making him a household name.
Praveen Kumar also played the role of "Saaboo" in Chacha Chaudhary (the T.V. series) for a large number of episodes.
After the Mahabharata serial, Praveen Kumar got many acting roles in Indian films, though he cut down on his acting career, in order to launch his political career in Haryana and Delhi. He also acted in the famous comedy Tamil film Micheal Madana Kama Rajan as a Body Guard.

Praveen Kumar was the actor to take the first blow of one of the most successful and famous punch dialogues of superstar Amitabh Bachchan, "Rishte Mein to Hum Tumhare Baap Hote hain, naam hai Shahenshah!" in Tinnu Anand's blockbuster Shahenshah. Praveen Kumar played the semi-comedic role of the legendary "Mukhtar Singh", a drug dealer who later becomes a dairy owner, upon being beaten up by Shahenshah.

Politics

In 2013 Kumar joined the Aam Aadmi Party (AAP). He contested the Delhi assembly elections from the Wazirpur constituency on an AAP ticket, but lost. The next year, he joined the Bharatiya Janata Party (BJP).

Death 
Sobti died from a heart attack in New Delhi on the night of 7 February 2022, at the age of 74.

Filmography

References

External links

 
 

1947 births
2022 deaths
Indian male film actors
Indian male discus throwers
Olympic athletes of India
Athletes (track and field) at the 1968 Summer Olympics
Athletes (track and field) at the 1972 Summer Olympics
Asian Games medalists in athletics (track and field)
Athletes (track and field) at the 1966 Asian Games
Athletes (track and field) at the 1970 Asian Games
Athletes (track and field) at the 1974 Asian Games
Athletes (track and field) at the 1966 British Empire and Commonwealth Games
Athletes (track and field) at the 1970 British Commonwealth Games
Athletes (track and field) at the 1978 Commonwealth Games
Commonwealth Games silver medallists for India
Commonwealth Games medallists in athletics
Indian male hammer throwers
Athletes from Punjab, India
Asian Games gold medalists for India
Asian Games silver medalists for India
Asian Games bronze medalists for India
Medalists at the 1966 Asian Games
Medalists at the 1970 Asian Games
Medalists at the 1974 Asian Games
Medallists at the 1966 British Empire and Commonwealth Games